Venserpolder is an Amsterdam Metro station in Amsterdam, Netherlands.

References

Amsterdam Metro stations
Amsterdam-Zuidoost
Railway stations opened in 1977